Holy Man is a 1998 American satirical comedy-drama film directed by Stephen Herek, written by Tom Schulman, and starring Eddie Murphy, Jeff Goldblum, Kelly Preston, Robert Loggia, Jon Cryer, and Eric McCormack. The film was a critical and commercial failure.

Plot
Ricky Hayman and Kate Newell work at the Good Buy Shopping Network, a home shopping channel run by John McBainbridge. Sales have been down over the last two years under Ricky's management, and Kate was brought in to come up with new ideas.

Ricky views Kate as a threat and she expresses her dislike for him as well. However, John has given Ricky an ultimatum to increase sales, or lose his job. While out driving one day, Ricky and Kate come across a charismatic strange man who calls himself "G". G is unusual in that he wears white robes and is perpetually happy and smiling. He seems to sense how troubled Ricky is, and follows them back to the Good Buy studio.

G wanders onto the set of an infomercial, and while he is on the air, the number of calls with customers wanting to buy something increases. Kate notices this and gets G his own spot on the network selling items. Meanwhile, the mutual dislike between Ricky and Kate fades and they begin to express romantic interest in each other.

G's infomercials are mostly spontaneous anecdotes or thoughts about life, but customers connect with him and even the slowest moving items begin selling out. While staying at Ricky's house, he encounters a party of businessmen and displays his talents by making a Rolex watch "disappear" and curing a man of his fear of flying. Ricky begins marketing G's name on other items to increase sales. He wants to give G his own show, but the stressful work environment and throngs of fans who want to meet G begin to take its toll.

G is no longer the happy, inspiring man he once was, and when Kate tries to convince John to let G leave the network, he refuses and she quits out of contempt. Ricky reaps the benefits of the increased sales, receiving a large promotion and a new office. However, the rewards seem hollow due to G's lethargy and Kate's rejection of him.

On the night of the premiere of G's new show, Ricky searches himself and decides that letting G go is the right choice. He announces his decision live on air to the studio audience and to his boss. Kate hears of his decision and forgives Ricky, racing back to the studio to be with him. They have a romantic reunion on the air, and the show is ended. Afterwards, Ricky and Kate say their goodbyes to the fully recovered G, who wanders off into the distance to continue his pilgrimage.

Cast
 Eddie Murphy as G
 Jeff Goldblum as Ricky Hayman
 Kelly Preston as Kate Newell
 Robert Loggia as John McBainbridge
 Jon Cryer as Barry
 Eric McCormack as Scott Hawkes
 Jennifer Bini Taylor as Hot Tub Girl
 Adriana Cataño as Television hostess
 Eugene Levy as Guy on background television (uncredited)

Morgan Fairchild, Betty White, Florence Henderson, James Brown, Soupy Sales, Dan Marino, Willard Scott, Nick Santa Maria and Nino Cerruti appear as themselves.

Production
According to Splitsider, John Candy was signed on for the role played by Murphy back in 1993, a year before the former's death. Murphy turned down the lead role that eventually went to Chris Tucker in Rush Hour to star in this film instead.

Reception

Box office
Holy Man was a major box office failure, as it grossed $12,069,719 in North America, compared to its budget of over $60 million. The film was released in the United Kingdom on February 19, 1999, and only opened on #8.

Critical response
Holy Man received largely negative reviews, with criticism aimed at the script and acting. Based on 50 reviews collected by the film review aggregate Rotten Tomatoes, 12% of critics gave Holy Man a positive review, with an average rating of 3.8/10. Its consensus states: "Cloying and unfunny, Holy Man wastes the repartee between Eddie Murphy and Jeff Goldblum on the gospel of toothless satire and unearned sentimentality." On Metacritic, which assigns a weighted average score out of 100, the film has a score of 41 based on reviews from 19 critics, indicating "mixed or average reviews". Roger Ebert for the Chicago Sun Times gave it 2 out of 4 stars, calling Murphy's character "an uninteresting enigma" and criticizing the film for being too credulous and missing opportunities for satire. Audiences polled by CinemaScore gave the film an average grade of "C+" on an A+ to F scale.

In June 2009, Murphy referred to Holy Man as a "horrendous movie". Although he did not identify the film by name, he mentioned it on The Tonight Show with Conan O'Brien as a reference to the film he starred in featuring a cameo with singer James Brown. In November 2011, on Late Night with Jimmy Fallon, Murphy outright called Holy Man a horrendous movie, though he later backtracked and said, "It's not that bad, but it's pretty bad."

References

External links
 
 
 

1998 films
1990s English-language films
1998 comedy-drama films
American comedy-drama films
Films scored by Alan Silvestri
American buddy films
Films directed by Stephen Herek
Films produced by Roger Birnbaum
Films set in Miami
Films shot in Miami
Caravan Pictures films
Touchstone Pictures films
1990s American films